Beipu Township (Hakka: Pet-phû-hiông) is a rural township in Hsinchu County, Taiwan. Beipu is well known in Taiwan as a center of Hakka culture, especially for production of dongfang meiren tea and its special Hakkanese blends of tea and nuts called lei cha.

History
The town was the scene of the 1907 Hoppo Uprising against Japanese rule of Taiwan when insurgents of both Hakka and indigenous Saisiyat extraction attacked Japanese officials and their families. In retaliation, Japanese military and police killed more than 100 Hakka people, the majority of whom were young men from Neidaping (內大坪), a small village in the mountainous southern part of the township.

Demographics
As of February 2023, Beipu had a population of 8,647, of whom 98 percent were Hakka.

Administrative divisions
The township comprises nine villages: Beipu, Nanxing, Dahu, Puwei, Shuiji, Nanpu, Dalin, Nankeng, and Waiping.

Tourist attractions
 Beipu Citian Temple
 Green World Ecological Farm

Notable natives
 Peng Tso-kwei, Minister of Council of Agriculture (1997–1999)
 Perng Shaw-jiin, Deputy Chairperson of Fair Trade Commission
 Huang Guo-shu, former President of the Legislative Yuan (1961-1972).

References

External links

  

Townships in Hsinchu County